Monica I. Orozco (born in Santa Barbara, California) is a historian and archivist. She is the Director of the Santa Barbara Mission-Archive Library as well as Executive Director of Mission Santa Barbara. She earned her doctorate in History at University of California, Santa Barbara in 1999, completing her dissertation entitled "Protestant Missionaries, Mexican Liberals, Nationalism and the Issue of Cultural Incorporation of Indians, 1870-1900." The dissertation focuses on the opening to foreign Protestants during the liberal era in Mexico, and their shared aim of incorporating indigenous culturally.  She has published a portion of her dissertation.

She taught Latin American history at University of California, Santa Barbara, Westmont College, and Santa Barbara City College. She also worked as an editor at ABC-CLIO.  Since 2009 she has served as the second lay director and professional archivist at  the Santa Barbara Mission Archive-Library. In 2016 she became the first lay executive director of the Santa Barbara Mission.  She is featured in a C-SPAN program on the Santa Barbara Mission and the Mission Archive-Library, highlighting the importance of both to the cultural life of the American West, California history, and indigenous history.

See also
List of people from Santa Barbara, California

References

External links
C-SPAN documentary on the Santa Barbara Mission and Mission Archive-Library
Roger Durling, "The S.B. Questionnaire: Monica Orozco", Santa Barbara Independent. 12 September 2016
Sam Goldman, "New Santa Barbara Mission Executive Director Monica Orozco Ready to Engage Community", Noozhawk 25 July 2016
Matt Kettman, "Monica Orozco's Mission Mission" Santa Barbara Independent. 3 August 2016
"Monica Orozco named new director at the Santa Barbara Mission Archive-Library," History Department, University of California, Santa Barbara announcement

Living people
People from Santa Barbara, California
American people of Mexican descent
Chicano
21st-century American historians
American women historians
Historians of Latin America
Historians of Mexico
Historians of Franciscan history
American archivists
Female archivists
University of California, Santa Barbara alumni
Santa Barbara City College alumni
Westmont College faculty
Year of birth missing (living people)
21st-century American women
Historians from California